Lawrence McFarlane "Baldy" Northcott (September 7, 1908 – November 7, 1986) was a Canadian professional ice hockey left winger. Born in Calgary, Alberta, Northcott played ten seasons in the National Hockey League for the Montreal Maroons and Chicago Black Hawks.

Playing career

Montreal Maroons
Northcott achieved all-star status in 1932–33 playing on a line with Jimmy Ward and Hooley Smith. In the 1934–35 Stanley Cup playoffs he scored the winning goal in two games, helping the Maroons win the Stanley Cup.

Chicago Blackhawks
After the Maroons folded, Northcott was traded to the Chicago Blackhawks where he would play his last game in the National Hockey league, retiring at the end of the 1938–39 season.

Coaching career
Northcott coached the Winnipeg Rangers of the Manitoba Junior Hockey League for one season in 1940–41, leading them to the Memorial Cup Championship.

Retirement
In his retirement Northcott operated an eponymously named sporting goods store in Winnipeg.

Awards and achievements

Player
 1932–33 - NHL First Team All-Star - Left Wing
 1934–35 - Stanley Cup Champion - Montreal Maroons
 1937–38 - Played in Howie Morenz Memorial Game
 Honoured Member - Manitoba Hockey Hall of Fame

Coach
 1940–41 - Memorial Cup Champion - Winnipeg Rangers

Career statistics

Regular season and playoffs

Transactions
 Traded by the Montreal Maroons with Earl Robinson and Russ Blinco to the Chicago Blackhawks for $30,000, September 15, 1938.

References

External links

1908 births
1986 deaths
Canadian ice hockey left wingers
Chicago Blackhawks players
Montreal Maroons players
Ice hockey people from Calgary
Stanley Cup champions